Bloody Lovely is the third studio album by Australian dance-punk band DZ Deathrays. It was released on I Oh You Records in February 2018. Australian radio station Triple J picked Bloody Lovely as their feature album of the week in February 2018. The music video for "Like People" featured one of the original members of The Wiggles, Murray Cook. It was nominated at the 2018 ARIA Music Awards for Best Hard Rock/Heavy Metal Album but lost to Parkway Drive for Reverence.

Reception 

The album was met with generally favourable reviews. On Metacritic, which assigns a normalised rating out of 100 to reviews from critics, the album has an average score of 63 based on 5 reviews. The lead single "Shred for Summer" placed within Triple J's Hottest 100, 2017 at no. 67 while the single "Total Meltdown" just missed out placing no. 109 within the Hottest 200 of 2017. On 18 February, the album peaked at No. 4 on the ARIA Charts and remained there for a total of two weeks.

Track listing

Personnel

DZ Deathrays
 Shane Parsons – lead vocals, guitars
 Simon Ridley – drums, percussion

Production
Burke Reid – producer
Simon Ridley – programming

Charts

References 

2018 albums
DZ Deathrays albums